Hezekiah Usher  (1615 – May 14, 1676) of Boston was the first known bookseller in British America. The first books printed in the Thirteen Colonies were published and sold by Usher.

Early life
Usher was born in 1615. The medieval records known as the Hundred Rolls show that Usher came from the then hamlet of Bednall Green (today's Bethnal Green) in East London in England.  The Usher family line itself is believed to be originally from the town of Bednall Green. The Usher family name is known in English history and literally means "one who introduced strangers." Usher and his brother Robert left Bednall Green and settled in the thirteen colonies. Usher came first to Cambridge.

As of 1642, he was the owner of a house in Cambridge (located on the northeast corner of Dunster and Winthrop) that was the property of William Andrew in 1635. Later, in 1645 Usher settled in Boston in the Massachusetts Bay Colony. He lived on the north side of Boston on State Street near the marketplace. Usher opened his first bookstore in Boston in 1647. His affairs prospered, and by 1652, he had become a well-known merchant and bookseller. Robert, his brother, had settled in Stamford, Connecticut.

Career

Usher was a commercial merchant and a real estate investor. He was the first known colonial bookseller. Most of the items he had for sale in his business as a merchant were books. One such book that he sold that was well received was the Bay Psalm Book, the first book printed in the thirteen colonies. The first edition was sold by Usher in Cambridge in 1640 and the fourth edition of the Bay Psalm Book was sold in Boston by Usher in 1652. He had also printed and distributed for free John Eliot's catechism in 1653.

Usher was agent for the London Society of the Corporation for Propagating the Gospel in managing the money matters between the corporation established in England for spreading the New Testament among the Indians in America and the commissioners of the thirteen colonies in New England. He was able to obtain paper and type fonts for printing the New Testament in the Indian language when he went to England in the winter of 1657/58.

The printing items he received he put in charge of Samuel Green in 1659 at Cambridge to print the Indian New Testament and other works. Usher distributed the Indian New Testaments free of charge from 1660 to 1663. Usher was the publisher of the laws of the Massachusetts Bay Colony for seven years under the monopoly he received from the Massachusetts General Court in 1672.

Wives and families
Usher's first wife was Frances (died February 25, 1652).

Their children were:
 Hezekiah, born in Cambridge June 6, 1639; m. 1679 Bridget (daughter of John Lisle, Esquire, one of Cromwell's Lords) (widow of Dr. Leonard Hoar, president of Harvard College). Hezekiah Jr. was accused of witchcraft in 1692 but not officially charged.
 Rebecca, born in Cambridge Nov 1640, married Abraham Brown, May 1, 1660.
 John, born in Cambridge September 11, 1643, died December, 1645.
 Elizabeth, born in Boston February 1, 1645; married Samuel Shimpton of the Bethnal Green Shrimpton family line.
 John, born in Boston April 17, 1648.
 Mehitable, born in Boston March 21, 1649
 Sarah, born in Boston Sept 11, 1650; married Jonathan Tyng.
 Rebecca, born in Boston 1651; married Abraham Brown 1 May 1660.

Usher's second wife was Elizabeth Symmes (daughter of Rev. Zechariah Symmes); married September 2, 1652.

Their children in this family were:
 Hannah, born December 29, 1653; died July 24, 1654.
 Zechariah, born December 26, 1654; died August 23, 1656.

Usher's third wife was Mary Alford Butler (daughter of William Alford and widow of Peter Butler). They had no children. She survived him and married Samuel Nowell of Charlestown, Massachusetts.

Death
Usher died in May 1676. His will is dated 11 May 1676 and proved 19 May 1676. During his lifetime he had accumulated much wealth in selling books and publications. Two of his sons quarreled over his estate, which ultimately had to be settled in court. Usher's will talks about his sister, Mrs. Elizabeth Harwood, and his brother-in-law, John Harwood. Usher and several of his family members are buried at the historic King's Chapel Burying Ground on Tremont Street in Boston.

Legacy

Usher was one of the founders of the First Church in Boston. He was a member of the Ancient and Honorable Artillery Company of Massachusetts. Usher was interested in Boston civic matters and held several town positions. He was elected selectman in 1659, a position he held until his death.

His son, also named Hezekiah Usher, built a mansion in Boston in 1684, which was located at today's Tremont Street and Temple Place.

See also
John Ratcliff

Notes
1.
2.

References

Bibliography 
 
 
 
 
 
 
 
 
 
 
 
 
 
 
 
 
 
 
 
 
 
 
 
 
 

 
 
 

1615 births
1676 deaths
Businesspeople from Cambridge, Massachusetts
Businesspeople from Boston
People from Bethnal Green
American booksellers
17th-century publishers (people)
17th-century printers
1639 establishments in Massachusetts
People of colonial Massachusetts
Kingdom of England emigrants to Massachusetts Bay Colony
Burials in Boston
17th-century American businesspeople